Elizabeth Jimie (born 28 June 1992 in Kuching, Sarawak) is a Malaysian diver, who specialised in individual and synchronised springboard events. She won the gold medal, along with her partner Leong Mun Yee, in the women's 3 m synchronised springboard event, and added the bronze for the 1 m springboard at the 2007 Southeast Asian Games in Bangkok, Thailand. She is also a two-time bronze medalist at the 2006 Asian Games in Doha, Qatar.

Jimie qualified for the women's 3 m individual springboard event at the 2008 Summer Olympics in Beijing, after finishing fifth in the Olympic test event. She finished twenty-first in the preliminary rounds of the competition, with a score of 253.50 points, tying a position with her diving partner Leung Mun Yee.

References

External links
NBC Olympics Profile

Malaysian female divers
Living people
Olympic divers of Malaysia
Divers at the 2008 Summer Olympics
People from Kuching
1992 births
Asian Games medalists in diving
Divers at the 2006 Asian Games
Asian Games bronze medalists for Malaysia
Medalists at the 2006 Asian Games
Southeast Asian Games gold medalists for Malaysia
Southeast Asian Games bronze medalists for Malaysia
Southeast Asian Games medalists in diving
Competitors at the 2007 Southeast Asian Games
21st-century Malaysian women